The Executive House is a historic house located at 125 West Del Monte Avenue in Clewiston, Florida. The house is locally significant as a well preserved example of the Mediterranean Revival style in Clewiston and as a representative work of Palm Beach architect Clark J. Lawrence.

Description and history 
It is a two-story, Mediterranean Revival style house with a three-story square tower with an irregular floor plan at one corner. The exterior walls have a stuccoed finish, resting on a concrete slab foundation, and are covered by cross-gable, hip, shed, and flat roof components. Tar and gravel is used for the flat roof; asphalt shingles cover the remaining roofed surfaces. The house is constructed of wood frame, covered with stucco.

It was added to the National Register of Historic Places on February 5, 1998.

References

External links

Hendry County listings at National Register of Historic Places
Hendry County listings at Florida's Office of Cultural and Historical Programs

Houses in Hendry County, Florida
Houses on the National Register of Historic Places in Florida
National Register of Historic Places in Hendry County, Florida
Houses completed in 1929
1929 establishments in Florida
Mediterranean Revival architecture in Florida